Majed Hassan (born 1 August 1992) is an Emirati footballer who plays as a midfielder in Sharjah and United Arab Emirates.

Honours
United Arab Emirates
 Gulf Cup of Nations: 2013
AFC Asian Cup third-place: 2015

References 

Living people
1992 births
Emirati footballers
Al Ahli Club (Dubai) players
Shabab Al-Ahli Club players
United Arab Emirates international footballers
2015 AFC Asian Cup players
2019 AFC Asian Cup players
Association football midfielders
UAE Pro League players